Rotomairewhenua / Blue Lake is a small lake in Nelson Lakes National Park, in the northern reaches of New Zealand's Southern Alps. Sacred to local Māori, it has the clearest natural fresh water in the world.

Description
The Blue Lake is drained by the west branch of the Sabine River, which is part of the Buller River system. It is fed by a short upper segment of the Sabine, which in turn is fed by underground seepage through the landslide debris impounding the much larger Lake Constance.

Clarity

The lake has extremely clear water, and is the clearest natural body of fresh water yet reported. Scientists attribute the lake water's clarity to its passage underground from Lake Constance, which filters out nearly all the particles suspended in the water. Its clarity reveals water's natural blue-violet colour.

Facilities and access

Blue Lake is most often reached as a side trip from the Travers-Sabine Circuit, although a marked route to the south, over the Waiau Pass and another to the West, via Moss Pass continues beyond the lake. The nearby Blue Lake Hut, with 16 bunks, provides accommodation for more than 700 trampers each year.

Māori history

Blue Lake lies within the rohe (tribal area) of Ngāti Apa ki te Rā Tō. As part of the iwi's 2010 treaty settlement, the lake passed into tribal ownership and was then given back to the Crown. The lake was traditionally used in ceremonies to cleanse the bones and release the spirits of the dead, so they could begin their journey to Hawaiki, and the iwi regard its waters as tapu (sacred). (Blue Lake was used only for males; Lake Constance was used for females.) Its Māori name, Rotomairewhenua, means "the lake of peaceful lands".

In August 2014, the official name for Blue Lake was altered to Rotomairewhenua / Blue Lake, following the Ngāti Apa ki te Rā Tō treaty settlement with the Crown.

References

Lakes of the Tasman District